The Gyrodyne GCA-2 was a general-purpose helicopter built by the Gyrodyne Company of America in the late 1940s.

Development
In 1946 the newly formed Gyrodyne Company acquired rights to the Bendix Model J and developed it into the GCA-2 (N74101). The GCA-2 was of all-metal construction, and had a coaxial twin rotor layout, with a five-seat cabin and a rounded fuselage with twin fins. Later on, the GCA-2 was designated GCA-2A Helidyne after being modified with twin 100hp Continental auxiliary engines mounted externally on strutted outriggers to give additional forward speed, flying on November 30, 1949. A second GCA-2 airframe, the GCA-2C (civil registration N6594K), first flew on April 25, 1952 piloted by Jim Ryan; it could also be used as an ambulance helicopter capable of carrying three litters.

Specifications (GCA-2C)

References

GCA-2
1940s United States helicopters
Aircraft first flown in 1949
Single-engined piston helicopters